The Patpong Museum is a museum in Bangkok, Thailand. Opened in 2019 in Patpong Soi 2, its collection includes interactive exhibitions, artifacts, and recreated spaces covering Patpong's history from its 1946 purchase by the Patpongpanich family and subsequent development. The presence of the CIA in Patpong through its secret airlines such as "Civil Air Transport" and "Air America" is highlighted and brings the cold war, the Vietnam war and the secret war in Laos into the context of Patpong. 

The second part of the exhibition is dedicated to Patpongs further development into one of the world's most famous entertainment areas and eventually red light districts. Superstars like David Bowie, Robert De Niro, Jean-Claude Van Damme and Christopher Walken visit and film in Patpong marking its presence in popular culture.

The privately owned museum is located on the 2nd floor of building 5, below Black Pagoda, and is open daily.

References

Museums in Bangkok
Tourist attractions in Bangkok
Bang Rak district